This is the discography of American rapper E-40.

Albums

Studio albums

Collaboration albums

Compilation albums

Mixtapes

Extended plays

Singles

As lead artist

As featured artist

Other charted songs

Guest appearances

Music videos
1992: "Tired Of Bein Stepped On" (The Click featuring Levitti)
1994: "Captain Save A Hoe" (featuring The Click)
1994: "Practice Lookin' Hard"
1995: "Birds in the Kitchen" (C-Bo featuring E-40)
1995: "Sprinkle Me" (featuring Suga-T)
1995: "1-Luv" (featuring Levitti)
1995: "Dusted 'N' Disgusted" (featuring Spice 1, 2Pac & Mac Mall)
1995: "Hurricane" (The Click)
1995: "Scandalous" (The Click featuring Roger Troutman)
1996: "Rappers' Ball" (featuring Too Short & K-Ci)
1996: "Things'll Never Change"
1997: "Yay Deep" (featuring B-Legit & Richie Rich)
1998: "From The Ground Up" (featuring Too Short & K-Ci & JoJo)
1998: "Hope I Don't Go Back"
1999: "Big Ballin' With My Homies"
2000: "Earl That's Yo' Life" (featuring Too Short & Otis & Shug) / "L.I.Q."
2000: "Nah, Nah..." (featuring Nate Dogg)
2000: "Behind The Gates" (featuring Ice Cube)
2001: "Say Dat Den" (The Click featuring Levitti)
2002: "Automatic" (featuring Fabolous)
2002: "Rep Yo City"/"Mustard & Mayonnaise"
2003: "One Night Stand" (featuring DJ Kayslay) / "Gasoline"
2003: "Quarterbackin'" (featuring Clipse)
2006: "Tell Me When to Go" (featuring Keak da Sneak)
2006: "U And Dat" (featuring T-Pain & Kandi Girl) 
2008: "Wake It Up" (featuring Akon)
2008: "Got Rich Twice" (featuring Turf Talk)
2010: "Bitch" (featuring Too Short)
2010: "Undastandz Me"
2010: "Over The Stove"
2010: "Lightweight Jammin" (featuring Clyde Carson & Husalah of Mob Figaz)
2010: "The Weedman" (featuring Stressmatic)
2010: "Can't Stop the Boss" (featuring Snoop Dogg, Too Short & Jazze Pha)
2010: "Spend the Night" (featuring Björk, Laroo, The DB'z, Droop-E & B-Slimm)
2010: "He's a Gangsta" (featuring Messy Marv, The Jacka & Kaveo)
2010: "Show Me What You Workin' Wit'" (featuring Too Short)
2010: "The Server"
2010: "Nice Guys"
2011: "My Lil' Grimey Nigga" (featuring Stressmatic)
2011: "My Money Straight" (featuring Guce, Black C & Young Jun3)
2011: "Me & My Bitch"
2011: "My Shit Bang"
2011: "Concrete" 
2011: "I Love My Momma" (featuring R.O.D. & Mic Conn)
2011: "Fuck 'Em"
2011: "That Candy Paint" (featuring Bun B & Slim Thug)
2011: "Rear View Mirror" (featuring B-Legit & Stressmatic)
2012: "Function" (featuring YG, IAmSu & Problem)
2012: "They Point" (featuring Juicy J & 2 Chainz)
2012: "Fast Lane"
2012: "Be You" (featuring Too $hort & J Banks)
2012: "What Happened to Them Days"(featuring J Banks)
2012: "Zombie" (featuring Brotha Lynch Hung & Tech N9ne)
2012: "Catch a Fade" (featuring Kendrick Lamar & Droop-E)
2012: "What You Smokin" (featuring Snoop Dogg, Daz Dillinger, kurupt & Kokane)
2012: "Im Laced" (featuring Cousin Fik)
2012: "Turn It Up"
2012: "Wasted" (featuring Cousin Fik)
2012: "Function" (Remix) (featuring Problem Chris Brown, Red Cafe, Young Jeezy & French Montana)
2012: "Dump Truck" (with Too Short featuring Travis Porter & Yung Chu)
2012: "Ballin' is Fun" (with Too Short featuring B-Legit)
2012: "Slide Through" (with Too Short featuring Tyga)
2012: "Money Motivated" (with Too Short)
2013: "Ripped" (featuring Lil Jon)
2014: "Red Cup" (featuring T-Pain, Kid Ink & B.o.B)
2015: "Choices (Yup)"

Notes
A.  Peaked only on the Bubbling Under Hot 100 Singles or Bubbling Under R&B/Hip-Hop Singles charts, which are 25-song extensions of the Hot 100 and Hot R&B/Hip-Hop Songs charts respectively.
A.  Charted only on the Hot R&B/Hip-Hop Airplay chart.

References

Discographies of American artists
Hip hop discographies